Hillsong Worship (formerly Hillsong Live) is a praise and worship collective from Sydney, Australia and Orange County, California. They started making music in 1983 at Hillsong Church. Fifteen of their songs have appeared on the Billboard magazine charts in the US, with "What a Beautiful Name" (2016) representing their greatest success, reaching platinum in the US. The band has some notable members, including Darlene Zschech, Marty Sampson, Brooke Fraser, Reuben Morgan, and Joel Houston.

Background
The group was formed in 1983 out of Sydney, Australia, where they were located at Hillsong Church, while now they are spread across the globe. Their members have gone on to individually successful careers, the likes of Darlene Zschech, Marty Sampson, Brooke Fraser, Reuben Morgan, and Joel Houston. The group was called Hillsong Live until June 2014, when they took the name Hillsong Worship.

History
Hillsong Worship released its first album, Spirit and Truth, in 1988.  Then, Show Your Glory in 1990,  The Power of Your Love in 1992, Stone's Been Rolled Away in 1993, People Just Like Us in 1994, Friends in High Places in 1995, Shout to the Lord (their first album in partnership with Integrity Music as part of the Hosanna! Music series) in 1996, God Is in the House in 1996, All Things Are Possible in 1997, and Touching Heaven Changing Earth in 1998, By Your Side in 1999, For This Cause in 2000, You Are My World in 2001, Blessed in 2002, Hope in 2003, For All You've Done in 2004, God He Reigns in 2005, Mighty to Save in 2006, Saviour King in 2007, This Is Our God in 2008, Faith + Hope + Love in 2009, A Beautiful Exchange in 2010, God Is Able in 2011, Cornerstone in 2012, Glorious Ruins in 2013, No Other Name, their first as Hillsong Worship, in 2014, Open Heaven / River Wild in 2015, Let There Be Light in 2016, The Peace Project in 2017, There Is More in 2018 and Awake in 2019. All of the group's albums since 2004 have been charted in Australia.

The group has also seen twelve albums chart on the Billboard magazine charts, where there have been placements on the Christian Albums and the Heatseekers Albums charts (those were For All You've Done, God He Reigns, and Mighty to Save). Their albums Saviour King, This Is Our God, Faith + Hope + Love, A Beautiful Exchange, God Is Able, Cornerstone, Glorious Ruins, No Other Name, and Open Heaven / River Wild have charted on the Billboard 200 and Christian Albums charts. Two of their albums, For All You've Done and Open Heaven / River Wild, have reached number one on the Australian ARIA Albums Chart.

In 2018, Hillsong Worship won the Grammy Award for Best Contemporary Christian Music Performance/Song with "What a Beautiful Name".

Their albums have been recorded by the labels Hillsong Music, Sony Music, Integrity Music, Epic Records, Columbia Records, and Sparrow Records.

Notable members 
The following have been or are currently members of Hillsong Worship:
 Darlene Zschech
 Geoff Bullock
 Brooke Fraser
 Joel Houston
 Reuben Morgan
 Annie Garratt
 Tarryn Stokes
 Ben Fielding
 Taya Smith

Discography

 Spirit and Truth (1988)
Show Your Glory (1990)
 The Power of Your Love (1992)
 Stone's Been Rolled Away (1993)
 People Just Like Us (1994)
 Friends in High Places (1995)
 God Is in the House (1996)
 All Things Are Possible (1997)
 Touching Heaven Changing Earth (1998)
 By Your Side (1999)
 For This Cause (2000)
 You Are My World (2001)
 Blessed (2002)
 Hope (2003)
For All You've Done (2004)
God He Reigns (2005)
Mighty to Save (2006)
Saviour King (2007)
This Is Our God (2008)
Faith + Hope + Love (2009)
A Beautiful Exchange (2010)
God Is Able (2011)
Cornerstone (2012)
Glorious Ruins (2013)
No Other Name (2014)
Open Heaven / River Wild (2015)
Let There Be Light (2016)
The Peace Project (2017)
There Is More (2018)
Awake (2019)
Take Heart (Again) (2020)
These Same Skies (2021)

Awards
As of 2020 the group has received one Grammy Award and nine Dove Awards.

APRA Awards
The APRA Awards are presented annually from 1982 by the Australasian Performing Right Association (APRA), "honouring composers and songwriters". They commenced in 1982.

! 
|-
| 2012 
| "It Is Well With My Soul" (Writers: Benjamin Fielding / Reuben Morgan) 
| Song of the Year
| 
| 
|-

Billboard Music Awards

|-
|rowspan="3"|2019 || Hillsong Worship|| Top Christian Artist || 
|-
| There is More|| Top Christian Album|| 
|-
| "Who You Say I Am"|| Top Christian Song|| 
|}

GMA Dove Awards

|-
|rowspan="4"|2017 || "What a Beautiful Name" || Song of the Year || 
|-
| "What a Beautiful Name" || Worship Song of the Year || 
|-
| rowspan="2" | Let There Be Light || Worship Album of the Year || 
|-
| Long Form Video of the Year || 
|-
|rowspan="3"|2019 || "Who You Say I Am" || Song of the Year || 
|-
| "Who You Say I Am" || Worship Song of the Year || 
|-
| "Who You Say I Am (Studio Version)" || Worship Recorded Song of the Year || 
|-
|rowspan="5"|2020 || Hillsong Worship || Artist of the Year || 
|-
| "King of Kings" || Song of the Year || 
|-
| "King of Kings (Live at Qudos Bank Arena, Sydney, AU 2019)" || Worship Song of the Year || 
|-
|  Awake || Worship Album of the Year || 
|-
|  Awake (Live) || Long Form Video of the Year || 
|}

References

External links
 
 New Release Today artist profile

1983 establishments in Australia
Musical groups established in 1983
Musical groups from Sydney
Performers of contemporary worship music
American Christian musical groups
Australian Christian musical groups